United Dictionary Co. v. G. & C. Merriam Co., 208 U.S. 260 (1907), was a United States Supreme Court case in which the Court held the copyright statute does not require notice of the American copyright on books published abroad and sold only for use there.

References

External links
 

1907 in United States case law
United States copyright case law
United States Supreme Court cases
United States Supreme Court cases of the Fuller Court